Tyler Joseph "TJ" Ducklo (born September 22, 1988) is an American political adviser who served as a Special Assistant to the President and White House Junior Deputy Press Secretary for the Biden Administration from January 2021 until February 13, 2021, when he resigned after threats he made to a reporter came to light. Ducklo previously worked as the national press secretary for the Joe Biden 2020 presidential campaign.

Ducklo was set in April 2022 to become chief communications officer and a senior adviser to John Cooper, the mayor of Nashville, Tennessee. Ducklo "will oversee the administration's communications team and advise Cooper on political and strategic decisions," The Tennessean newspaper reported. Ducklo "recently began working with the team part-time and will transition to his full-time role on April 25."

Early life and education 
Ducklo was born in Nashville, Tennessee, and is the son of prominent Nashville optometrist Dr. Tommy Ducklo.

He earned a Bachelor of Arts degree in political communication from George Washington University School of Media and Public Affairs in 2011.

Career 
Ducklo previously worked as a staff assistant for James Carville and Mary Matalin. He volunteered for Karl Dean's 2007 Nashville mayoral campaign and interned in the United States Senate in 2008. Ducklo also worked on Washington, D.C.'s bid to host the 2024 Summer Olympics and has held senior media relations posts at Bloomberg News, Viacom, and the Motion Picture Association of America. In addition, Ducklo was a public relations advisor for Showtime's 2016 documentary The Circus.

Ducklo joined the Biden campaign in April 2019, his first major role on a political campaign. Before joining the Biden campaign, Ducklo worked as senior communications director for NBC News.

Deputy Press Secretary
On January 15, 2021, it was announced that Ducklo would serve as a White House deputy press secretary in the Biden Administration.

In February 2021, People reported that Ducklo was in a romantic relationship with Alexi McCammond, who covered the Biden campaign and administration for NBC and MSNBC as a contributor and as a reporter for Axios in 2019 and 2020. As a result, McCammond was reassigned to covering Vice President Kamala Harris and progressive lawmakers in Congress.

After the profile was released, Vanity Fair reported that Ducklo threatened Politico reporter Tara Palmeri, telling her he would "destroy her" if she published a story about his relationship with McCammond. He had also reportedly made "derogatory and misogynistic comments" toward Palmeri during a phone call and accused her of being "jealous" of his relationship with McCammond. On February 12, Ducklo was suspended without pay for one week and apologized. He resigned from his White House position the next day.

Public relations
In June 2021, Ducklo joined Risa Heller Communications, boutique public relations firm in New York, as a senior vice president.

Personal life 
In December 2019, Ducklo announced on Twitter that he had been diagnosed with stage-four lung cancer. As of February 2021, Ducklo continued to receive treatment.

References

External links
 
 

1988 births
Biden administration personnel
George Washington University School of Media and Public Affairs alumni
Living people
NBC employees
People from Nashville, Tennessee
Political staffers
Washington, D.C., Democrats
American public relations people